Red Light Company were a five-piece alternative rock band based in London, England. The band was formed in 2007 by members Richard Frenneaux (vocals/guitar), Shawn Day (bass), James Griffiths (drums), Paul Mellon (guitar) and Chris Edmonds (keyboards). They came together following an advert Richard posted on the internet, to which Shawn quickly responded, and moved from his home in Wyoming, United States to London in order to pursue making music with the rest of the group.

Currently signed to Lavolta Records, Red Light Company have received favourable comparisons to Arcade Fire, U2 and Editors.

The band toured with Editors in early 2008, before releasing their debut single "With Lights Out," about a childhood friend of Frenneaux's who committed suicide. Their second single "Meccano" was released on 11 August 2008, followed by their third single "Scheme Eugene" on 3 November 2008.

Red Light Company have been named as one of the hottest new bands of 2009 by both NME and HMV. Their debut album Fine Fascination was released on 2 March 2009, along with their fourth single "Arts & Crafts" on the same day.

On 16 June 2009 the band's myspace blog posted that Shawn Day (bass, vocals) had left the band to pursue other projects, they also wrote they would be re-releasing "Meccano" on 3 August 2009, almost a whole year since the previous version, with the public assumption of a slightly different sound without Day's bass and vocal parts.

Red Light Company played their final show at V Festival 2009, they have since announced that the band is no longer together.

Richard Frenneaux has now started a new band, Anothers Blood, with a scheduled release for their first single, "Lost Communication" on 3 October 2011.

Discography

Albums
Fine Fascination No. 13 UK

Singles

References

External links
Red Light Company's official website
Red Light Company on Columbia Records
Red Light Company's official MySpace page
Red Light Company on Discogs
Interview with the band on Scene Magazine's website

English indie rock groups
Musical groups established in 2007